Thomas Fletcher (April 8, 1817February 26, 1880) was an American politician and lawyer who served as acting governor of Arkansas from November 4 to 15, 1862, following the resignation of Henry M. Rector. He was president of the Arkansas Senate from 1858 to 1864, and in exile at Washington, Arkansas until 1865.

Early life 
Fletcher was born on April 8, 1817, at Nashville, Tennessee. He became prominent in the profession of law and, during the Polk administration, was appointed a United States marshal. An attorney in Hinds County, Mississippi in 1850, he later moved to Arkansas County, Arkansas. Turning to elective politics, he represented the 18th district in the Arkansas Senate from 1858 to 1864, and in the State government in exile at Washington, Arkansas until the end of the American Civil War.

Acting Governor of Arkansas 
Fletcher's service as acting governor of Arkansas continued from the resignation of Henry M. Rector until the inauguration of Harris Flanagin, who was chosen at the general election held on October 6, 1862. Fletcher's tenure of the office as acting governor was by virtue of his position as president of the Arkansas Senate.

Later life and death 
After the reconstruction period ended in Arkansas, he represented the 16th district in the Arkansas Senate. In 1878 he began the practice of the law at Little Rock, Arkansas, but his career was soon afterward terminated by his death at age 62, on February 26, 1880, at Little Rock, due to complications from pneumonia.

See also  
 List of burials at Mount Holly Cemetery
 List of Freemasons
 List of governors of Arkansas
 List of people from Nashville, Tennessee
 List of pneumonia victims

References

Further reading

External links 
 

1817 births
1880 deaths
19th-century American judges
19th-century American lawyers
19th-century American politicians
19th-century Methodists
Acting Governors of Arkansas
American Freemasons
American lawyers admitted to the practice of law by reading law
Methodists from Arkansas
American slave owners
Arkansas Democrats
Arkansas Independents
Arkansas state senators
Burials at Mount Holly Cemetery
Confederate States of America state governors
Deaths from pneumonia in Arkansas
Democratic Party governors of Arkansas
Exiled politicians
Farmers from Arkansas
Lawyers from Little Rock, Arkansas
People from Hinds County, Mississippi
People from Nashville, Tennessee
People of Arkansas in the American Civil War
Politicians from Arkansas County, Arkansas
Polk administration personnel
Recipients of American presidential pardons
United States Marshals
University of Nashville alumni